Danilo Cardoso Novais da Silva (born 27 March 1997), known as Danilo Cardoso or just Danilo, is a Brazilian footballer who plays as a central defender for Athletic-MG.

Club career
Danilo was born in Umuarama, Paraná, and was a Villa Nova youth graduate. After being a part of the first team squad in the 2018 Campeonato Mineiro, he moved to Athletic-MG and achieved promotion from the Campeonato Mineiro Segunda Divisão.

In 2019, Danilo moved to Coimbra, and won the year's Campeonato Mineiro Módulo II with the club. In September 2020, he returned to Athletic, and again achieved promotion with the side.

On 1 June 2021, Danilo moved to Inter de Limeira on loan until the end of the Série D. He left the club due to personal reasons on 28 July, and subsequently represented  and  before returning to Athletic on 15 December 2021.

On 5 May 2022, Danilo was presented at Vitória. He asked to leave the club on 12 July, and joined Goiás six days later.

Danilo made his Série A debut on 23 July 2022, starting and scoring his team's second in a 3–3 away draw against São Paulo.

Career statistics

Honours
Coimbra
Campeonato Mineiro Módulo II: 2019

References

External links
Futebol de Goyaz profile 

1997 births
Living people
Sportspeople from Paraná (state)
Brazilian footballers
Association football defenders
Campeonato Brasileiro Série A players
Campeonato Brasileiro Série C players
Campeonato Brasileiro Série D players
Villa Nova Atlético Clube players
Coimbra Esporte Clube players
Associação Atlética Internacional (Limeira) players
Esporte Clube Vitória players
Goiás Esporte Clube players